A Night On Earth is the name of a Crazy Penis album produced in 2005.

Track listing
"Lady T"
"Can't Get Down"
"Bumcop"
"A Night on Earth"
"Turnaway"
"Music's My Love"
"Life Is My Friend"
"Cruising"
"Kicks"
"In Deep"
"Sweet Feeling"
"Sun-Science"
"Warm on the Inside"

The cover design was done by Gregory McKneally and David Vigh.

Charts

References

2005 albums